Love & Life is the debut studio album by LaToya London. It was released on September 20, 2005 through the record label Peak Records and distributed through Concord Records. The album features a mix of R&B, soul, jazz and hip-hop, and has sold approximately 73,000 copies since its release.

Reception

Critical response 

A reviewer from the San Francisco Chronicle called her "impassioned and polished" with "sumptuous, wondrously elastic mezzo pipes".  A reviewer from People magazine called it one of the best post-American Idol albums, and a reviewer from iTunes named it one of the best albums of 2005, and her song "Non A What'cha Do" as one of the best individual recordings of the year.

Commercial performance 
Love & Life sold 12,546 albums in its first week, landing at number 82 on Billboard Top 200 Albums chart and at number 27 on Billboard Top R&B/Hip-Hop Albums. To date, it has sold approximately 58,000 copies, including 15,000 digital downloads.

Singles
Love & Life spawned three singles: "Appreciate", "Every Part of Me", and "State of My Heart". "State of My Heart" reached number 40 on the US Billboard Adult Contemporary chart and number five on the radio industry periodical Friday Morning Quarterbacks Adult Contemporary spin chart.

Track listingNotes'
  denotes an associate producer

Charts

References

2005 debut albums
LaToya London albums